In Egyptian mythology, Chensit (also spelled Khensit), which means placenta, was the patron goddess of the twentieth nome of Lower Egypt. Chensit was the wife of Sopdu and the daughter of Ra, and was depicted as an uraeus.

Egyptian goddesses
Tutelary deities

ca:Llista de personatges de la mitologia egípcia#C